Transport in Oradea is provided by a network of public transport operating trams and buses, as well as roads. Tram and bus services are run by Oradea Transport Local S.A. (commonly known as OTL).

Roads

Tram

There are three tram lines in Oradea, and these run together for most of their journey. The lines are 1, 2 and 3. Lines 1 and 3 run together in a city loop, while Line 2 joins part of this loop in part of its journey. All quarters except Vie are served by trams. Trams do not actually run in the city centre, since this is a historic area with narrow streets. They do, however, run on the border of the city in a loop, and then continue through to all the residential areas and quarters.

 Line 1 (1 red, 1R [Roşu], and 1 black, 1N [Negru] (completes the circuit the other way around)) runs from Sinteza Factory, which is located in the industrial west of Oradea, very close to the township of Borş and the Hungarian border, via the quarter of Rogerius, the central railway station, the city centre and then loops back to Rogerius.
 Line 2 runs from Ioșia quarter via the southern city centre and the heart of the city (Unirii Square) to Cantemir quarter and then Nufărul.
 Line 3 (3 red, 3R [Roşu], and 3 black, 3N [Negru]) (completes the circuit the other way around)) runs from Nufărul and then does the city loop from the Civic Centre onwards, terminating back at the Civic Centre near the main market.

Line 3 was called Line 4 before 2004, and there was no route named Line 3. However, in order to make the line order more logical, Line 4 was renamed Line 3 in 2004.

In 2008 and 2009 10 new Siemens ULF trams were introduced to the Oradea tram system. The first Siemens tram was put in service in April 2008.

In 2018, Oradea took delivery of 10 Tatra KT4D trams from the Berlin transport operator BVG.

Grafic circulaţie tramvaie

http://www.otlra.ro/cms/upload/www.otlra.ro/pagini/ro/linii/up_16.png

http://www.otlra.ro/cms/upload/www.otlra.ro/pagini/ro/linii/up_16.pnghttp://www.otlra.ro/cms/upload/www.otlra.ro/pagini/ro/linii/up_16.png

Bus

OTL runs the following bus routes in Oradea:

Linii autobuze

References

External links
 
 Tram and Bus Schedule 

Oradea
Oradea